Emil Baer Fetzer (January 4, 1916 – November 2, 2009) was an American architect and the head architect of the Church of Jesus Christ of Latter-day Saints (LDS Church) from 1965 to his retirement in 1986.

Architectural training
Fetzer received a degree in architecture from the University of Southern California in 1943. He then went to work for the architectural firm of Fetzer and Fetzer in Salt Lake City, Utah, which included his father John Fetzer, Sr. and his uncle Henry. Some of his first works were Brockbank Junior High in Magna, Utah, and Union High School in Roosevelt, Utah. On the campus of Brigham Young University he designed the Smoot administration building and the Spencer W. Kimball Tower.

Church architect

Temples
In 1965, Fetzer was appointed as the architect of the LDS Church by David O. McKay. He was the architect for LDS Church temples on five continents. His temples outside the U.S. include the Mexico City Mexico Temple, Sao Paulo Brazil Temple,  Santiago Chile Temple, Freiberg Germany Temple, Sydney Australia Temple, and the Tokyo Japan Temple. In Oceania, he designed the Nuku'alofa Tonga Temple and was the initial architect on the Papeete Tahiti Temple. He was also involved with the planning for the first Apia Samoa Temple. He was influenced in his design of the Mexico City Mexico Temple by ancient Mayan temples.

In the U.S., he designed the Atlanta Georgia Temple, Jordan River Utah Temple, Provo Utah Temple, Ogden Utah Temple, and Seattle Washington Temple. He was the general supervising architect for the Washington DC Temple. Fetzer also designed the building that houses the Manhattan New York Temple, although the temple itself and spire were constructed 18 years after his retirement.

All of Fetzer's temples were designed with single spires (see Temple architecture (LDS Church)). Many of his temples (including the temples in Tonga, Samoa, Tahiti, Australia, and Chile) are similar in floor plan, but differ slightly for a locale-specific flair. The Ogden and Provo temples had nearly identical exteriors with large orange central spires that symbolized the pillar of fire by night set upon a large white building that represented the pillar of cloud by day, referring to the Israelites in their exodus from Egypt spoken of in Exodus 13:21–22. The spires of the Ogden and Provo temples were later painted white.

Other church buildings
Other buildings he designed include the South Visitors Center on Temple Square. Fetzer was also the general supervisor of the refurbishing of the Salt Lake Assembly Hall.

Personal life
Fetzer was the son of John Fetzer, Sr. (one of six architects for the Idaho Falls Temple) and Margaret Baer. He was the brother of Primary song composer Elizabeth Fetzer Bates. He married June Alma Seyfarth on June 14, 1940, in the Salt Lake Temple. Fetzer died of causes incident to age.

Selected works

Notes

1916 births
2009 deaths
20th-century American architects
American Latter Day Saint artists
Brigham Young University people
German Latter Day Saints
USC School of Architecture alumni
Architects of Latter Day Saint religious buildings and structures
Architects from Utah